Fountain Hill may refer to the following places in the United States:

 Fountain Hill, Arkansas
 Fountain Hills, Arizona
 Fountain Hill, Pennsylvania

See also
Fountains Fell, North Yorkshire, England